Crematogaster afghanica is a species of ant in tribe Crematogastrini. It was described by Forel in 1967.

References

afghanica
Insects described in 1967